The British Steel Smelters' Association (BSSA) was a trade union representing steel smelters and workers in related trades in Britain.

History
The union was founded in after a strike at the David Colville and Sons Works in Motherwell in 1885.  This succeeded in preventing third-hand melters from being laid off, and one of them, John Hodge became the secretary of the new union, founded in 1886.  Although its founders were all based in Scotland, it rapidly spread into England and Wales, having 750 members by 1888, and 2,700 in 1890.  In 1899, its name was lengthened to the British Steel Smelters, Mill, Iron, Tinplate and Kindred Trades Association, as it attempted to recruit other metalworkers.  However, this faced strong opposition from other unions in the industry, including the National Blastfurnacemen's Federation, the Associated Iron and Steel Workers of Great Britain, and the Tin and Sheet Millmen's Association.  A few smaller unions merged into the BSSA, including the Amalgamated Society of Enginemen, Cranemen and Firemen, in 1912.

Ongoing disputes did not prevent the BSSA from expanding to 39,507 members by 1917, but a series of demarcation disputes between these unions led several of them to form the Iron and Steel Trades Confederation that year.

General Secretaries
1886: John Hodge

Assistant General Secretaries
1900: J. T. Macpherson
1906: Arthur Pugh

References

External links
Catalogue of the BSSA archives, held at the Modern Records Centre, University of Warwick

Defunct trade unions of the United Kingdom
1886 establishments in the United Kingdom
Steel industry trade unions of the United Kingdom
Trade unions established in 1886
Iron and Steel Trades Confederation amalgamations
Trade unions disestablished in 1917
Trade unions based in London